Drnovice refers to the following places in the Czech Republic:

 Drnovice (Blansko District), a village in Blansko District
 Drnovice (Vyškov District), a village in Vyškov District
 Drnovice (Zlín District), a village in Zlín District